Xu Lin (born June 1963) is a Chinese politician, who is currently serving as the Communist Party secretary of Guizhou. Previously he served as director of the State Council Information Office and director of the National Radio and Television Administration. He also served as the main official in charge of internet policy, the head of the Cyberspace Administration of China, from June 2016 to July 2018. Xu was previously the head of the Shanghai propaganda department and later Chinese Communist Party Committee Secretary of Pudong.

Biography 
Xu Lin was born in Shanghai in June 1963. He was graduated from Shanghai Normal University and joined the Chinese Communist Party (CCP) in September 1982. Xu was the teacher of Zhoupu High School, and the CCP standing committee member and acting deputy county chief in Nanhui County at the age of 29. Later, he became the CCP deputy secretary of Jiading District. In 1995, he became deputy secretary of Shigatse Prefecture in Tibet.

Xu returned to Shanghai in 1997, and served as the general manager of Nong Gong Shang Group. Later, he served as Party branch chief and CEO. In 2003, Xu was appointed as director of Civil Affairs Bureau of Shanghai and director of Agriculture Committee of Shanghai in 2007. In 2008, Xu became the Party Committee Secretary of Pudong. He served as the head of the Shanghai CCP's propaganda department in 2013.

In 2015, Xu served as the deputy head of the General Office of the Central Leading Group for Internet Security and Informatization, and promoted to the head on June 29, 2016. Xu is regarded as a political ally of Xi Jinping, the current General Secretary of the Chinese Communist Party and paramount leader, and dubbed a “political star” by the 21st Century Business Herald (21世纪经济报道).

In 2018, Xu was appointed as the director of the State Council Information Office. Xu is a member of the 19th Central Committee of the Chinese Communist Party.

In November 2020, Xu Lin, gave a speech in which he emphasized the need for the Chinese Communist Party to reinforce its control over commercial media ventures.

On 3 February 2023 he was removed as the director of the National Radio and Television Administration.

References 

1960 births
Living people
Shanghai Normal University alumni
People's Republic of China politicians from Shanghai
Chinese Communist Party politicians from Shanghai
Members of the 19th Central Committee of the Chinese Communist Party